Viên An may refer to several places in Vietnam, including:

 , a rural commune of Ứng Hòa District.
 Viên An, Cà Mau, a rural commune of Ngọc Hiển District.
 , a rural commune of Trần Đề District.